Siciliaria crassicostata is a species of small air-breathing land snail, a terrestrial pulmonate gastropod mollusk in the family Clausiliidae, the door snails, all of which have a clausilium.

Distribution 
This species occurs in the Mediterranean island of Sicily.

External links 

 Animal Base info

Clausiliidae
Gastropods described in 1856